Jerome Tillman (born April 25, 1987) is an American professional basketball player for Toyotsu Fighting Eagles Nagoya in Japan. He played collegiate basketball at Ohio University. He averaged  15.9 points and 8.2 rebounds per game with Sendai 89ers during the 2019-20 season. Tillman signed with Toyotsu Fighting Eagles Nagoya on June 29, 2020.

Career statistics 

|-
| align="left" |  2013-14
| align="left" | Hokkaido
| 54||54 ||19.6 ||.538 ||.402 ||.767 ||8.9 ||1.5 ||1.2 ||0.7 || 19.6
|-
| align="left" | 2014-15
| align="left" | Hokkaido
| 54||54 || 35.5|| .524|| .306|| .729|| 9.8|| 1.8|| 2.0|| 0.9|| 22.8 
|-
| align="left" |  2015-16
| align="left" | Hokkaido
| 55||55 || 35.3|| .502|| .354|| .736|| 9.7|| 1.2|| 1.5|| 0.6||  23.5 
|-
| align="left" |  2016-17
| align="left" | Nagoya D
| 56 || 17 ||26.9  || .451 || .373 || .780 ||7.3  || 0.8 || 1.0 || 0.3 || 16.2
|-
| align="left" |  2017-18
| align="left" | Nagoya D
| 60 || 1 ||17.4  || .416 || .335 || .794 ||3.9  ||1.0 || 0.5 || 0.1 || 9.1
|-
|}

References

1987 births
Living people
American expatriate basketball people in France
American expatriate basketball people in Germany
American expatriate basketball people in Israel
American expatriate basketball people in Japan
American expatriate basketball people in Spain
American men's basketball players
Basketball players from Ohio
Élan Chalon players
Hapoel Eilat basketball players
Kyoto Hannaryz players
Levanga Hokkaido players
Mitteldeutscher BC players
Nagoya Diamond Dolphins players
Ohio Bobcats men's basketball players
People from Beavercreek, Ohio
Power forwards (basketball)
Sendai 89ers players
Toyotsu Fighting Eagles Nagoya players
Tryhoop Okayama players